Árni Már Árnason (born 9 October 1987, in Mosfellsbær, Iceland) is an Olympic and national record holding freestyle swimmer from Iceland. He swam for Iceland at the 2008 Olympics.

He has swum for Iceland at:
Olympics: 2008, 2012
Games of the Small States of Europe: 2009 and 2011
European Junior Championships.

At the 2008 Olympics, he set the Icelandic Record in the 50 free at 22.81.

From 2008–12, he has attended college and swam collegiately for the USA's Old Dominion University.

References

1987 births
Living people
Icelandic male freestyle swimmers
Olympic swimmers of Iceland
Swimmers at the 2008 Summer Olympics
Swimmers at the 2012 Summer Olympics
20th-century Icelandic people
21st-century Icelandic people